Martin Regáli (born 12 October 1993) is a Slovak professional footballer who plays as a forward who plays for Belgian club Kortrijk.

Regáli won the 2014–15 DOXXbet liga with the Zemplín Michalovce.

Club career

Career in Slovakia
Regáli was born in Prešov in Slovakia. He made his professional Fortuna Liga debut for Zemplín Michalovce against AS Trenčín on 18 July 2015.

During the winter break of 2018–19 season he announced to the management of Zemplín, that he will not extend a contract with the club.

KV Kortrijk
On 3 January 2023, Regáli's transfer to Kortrijk was announced.

International career
Regáli was never a part of youth national teams. In March 2022, Štefan Tarkovič called him up for Slovak national teams friendly fixtures against Norway and Finland, at the age of 28. On 25 March, he made his international debut at Ullevaal Stadion in a 0–2 loss against Norway. Regáli came on the pitch during 35th minute to replace injured Tomáš Suslov on the right wing with a score still being goal-less. Second-half goals by Erling Haaland and Martin Ødegaard caused the 2–0 win for the home side. He made further appearances in the calendar year, including appearances in the negatively perceived campaign 2022–23 UEFA Nations League C campaign, in which Slovakia had failed to win the anticipated promotion. 

On 20 November 2022 Regáli played a notable role in Marek Hamšík's international farewell match. In the 89th minute of the match by Hamšík departed the international game for the final time during a substitution, when he was replaced and retired by Regáli. During the substitution, Hamšík was exited by a standing ovation of almost 20 thousand spectators of an essentially sold out stadium. During the stoppage time the score did not change and remained at a goal-less tie. Regáli sealed his debut year off with a nomination for national team prospective players' training camp at NTC Senec days later, in December.

References

External links
 MFK Zemplín Michalovce official profile
 Futbalnet profile
 Eurofotbal profile
 

1993 births
Living people
Sportspeople from Prešov
Slovak footballers
Slovakia international footballers
Association football forwards
MFK Zemplín Michalovce players
MFK Ružomberok players
K.V. Kortrijk players
2. Liga (Slovakia) players
Slovak Super Liga players
Belgian Pro League players
Slovak expatriate footballers
Expatriate footballers in Belgium
Slovak expatriate sportspeople in Belgium